Hill Country Village is a city in Bexar County, Texas, United States. The population was 985 at the 2010 census. It is an enclave of San Antonio and is part of the San Antonio Metropolitan Statistical Area. It is the 7th wealthiest location in Texas by per capita income.

Geography

Hill Country Village is located at  (29.581627, –98.485820).

Demographics

At the 2000 census there were 1,028 people in 340 households, including 294 families, in the city. The population density was 471.5 people per square mile (182.1/km). There were 349 housing units at an average density of 160.1 per square mile (61.8/km).  The racial makeup of the city was 94.36% White, 1.07% African American, 0.58% Native American, 1.17% Asian, 1.36% from other races, and 1.46% from two or more races. Hispanic or Latino of any race were 15.86%.

Of the 340 households 39.7% had children under the age of 18 living with them, 79.1% were married couples living together, 4.7% had a female householder with no husband present, and 13.5% were non-families. 11.5% of households were one person and 5.3% were one person aged 65 or older. The average household size was 3.02 and the average family size was 3.27.

The age distribution was 28.2% under the age of 18, 5.0% from 18 to 24, 17.6% from 25 to 44, 36.6% from 45 to 64, and 12.6% 65 or older. The median age was 45 years. For every 100 females, there were 100.0 males. For every 100 females age 18 and over, there were 96.3 males.

The median household income was $130,897 and the median family income  was $147,176. Males had a median income of $100,000 versus $40,750 for females. The per capita income for the city was $77,374. About 3.2% of families and 5.1% of the population were below the poverty line, including 9.0% of those under age 18 and 1.4% of those age 65 or over.

Politics

Hill Country Village is a largely Republican jurisdiction. IT has voted for the GOP in the last five presidential elections.

Education 
The city is served by North East Independent School District. Hidden Forest Elementary School, Bradley Middle School, and Churchill High School in San Antonio serve Hill Country Village.

The San Antonio Public Library System serves Hill Country Village.

References

External links

 Hill Country Village official website

Cities in Bexar County, Texas
Cities in Texas
Greater San Antonio